Humphries is a surname, and may refer to:

 Barry Humphries (born 1934), Australian comedian, creator of characters Dame Edna Everage and Sir Les Patterson
 Carla Humphries (born 1988), American-born Filipina actress and commercial model, also known as Carla Loren
 Charles Humphries, British countertenor
 Chris Humphries (1947–2009), British botanist
 David Humphries (1953–2020), English cricketer, brother of Mark Humphries
 Edward "Ted" Humphries, Australian politician
 Gary Humphries (born 1958), Australian politician
 Gemma Humphries, British weather forecaster
 Gerald Humphries (1908–1983), English cricketer
 Henry Humphries (1879–1964), Canadian cricketer
 Isaac Humphries (born 1998), Australian basketball player
 Jay Humphries (born 1962), American basketball player
 Jimmie Humphries (1889–1971), American professional baseball player, manager and executive
 Joe Humphries (1876–1946), English cricketer
 John Humphries (disambiguation), several people
 Kaillie Humphries (born 1985), Canadian/American bobsledder
 Kris Humphries (born 1985), American basketball player
 Leonard Humphries (born 1970), American football player
 Les Humphries (1940–2007), English-born founder of the Les Humphries Singers
 Lex Humphries (1936–1994), American jazz drummer
 Luke Humphries (born 1995), English darts player
 Mark Humphries (born 1965), English cricketer, brother of David Humphries
 Ralph "Rusty" Humphries (born 1965), American radio presenter
 Sage Humphries (born 1998), American ballet dancer and model
 Shawn Paul Humphries (1971–2005), American murderer
 Stan Humphries (born 1965), American football player
 Tessa Humphries, Australian actress
 Tom Humphries, Irish former sports journalist and convicted child molester
 Tony Humphries (administrator), former administrator of the British Indian Ocean Territory
 Tony Humphries (musician) (born 1957), American DJ and producer

See also
 
Humfrey, given name and surname
Humphery, surname
Humphrey, given name and surname
Humphreys (surname)
Humphry, surname
Humphrys, surname

English-language surnames
Patronymic surnames
Surnames from given names